The Social Study of Information Systems (SSIS) is interested in people developing and using technology and the "culture" of those people.

SSIS studies these phenomena by drawing on and using "lenses" provided by social sciences, including philosophy, sociology, social psychology, organisational theory, political science.

Key universities
Key Universities involved in SSIS are: the London School of Economics (LSE), Lancaster University, University of Manchester University of Warwick, the Massachusetts Institute of Technology (MIT), University of Salford, Case Western Reserve University, the University of Cambridge, Edinburgh University, Harvard University, and Peking University.

Key people
High profile people in the field are Claudio Ciborra, Jannis Kallinikos, Chrisanthi Avgerou & Susan Scott, Tony Cornford (LSE), Wanda Orlikowski (MIT), Shoshana Zuboff (Harvard), Lucas Introna & Lucy Suchman (Lancaster), Joe Nandhakumar (Warwick), Wendy Currie (Greenwich), Geoff Walsham, Mathew Jones & Michael Barrett (Cambridge), Richard Boland  &  Kalle Lyytinen (Case Western), Rob Kling (Indiana).

Key publications
Quast, M., Handel, M. J., Favre, J.-M., Estublier, J. (2013) Social Information Systems : Agility Without Chaos, Enterprise Information Systems, Springer.
Walsham, G. (1993) Interpreting information systems in organizations, John Wiley, Chichester.
Zuboff, S. (1988) In the age of the smart machine: The future of work and power, Heinemann Professional, Oxford.

See also
 Formative context

References
WJ Orlikowski, JJ Baroudi (1991) 'Studying Information Technology in Organizations: Research Approaches and Assumptions', Information Systems Research, 1991
Avgerou C, (2000) ‘Information systems: what sort of science is it?’ Omega, vol 28, pp 567–579

External links
http://ccs.mit.edu/Wanda.html
http://www.lse.ac.uk/collections/informationSystems/research/researchFoci/Default.htm

Information systems